Stefan Majchrowski (13 March 1908 in Grodzisk Mazowiecki – 22 February 1988 in Warsaw, Poland) was a Polish writer.

Majchrowski fought in the Invasion of Poland of 1939. He was later captured and incarcerated in the German POW camp. After his liberation by American forces, he served in the Polish Armed Forces in the West.

In 2009, he was posthumously awarded by President Lech Kaczynski the Officer's Cross of the Order of Polonia Restituta "for outstanding contribution to the independence of the Polish Republic, for activities on behalf of democratic change in Poland as well as veterans and social activities for their performance in the work undertaken for the benefit of the country and social activities".

Works

Biographical Stories
 Pan Sienkiewicz 1961
 Sienkiewicz 1975
 Pan Fredro 1965
 Opowieść o Józefie Wybickim 1973
 O Julianie Niemcewiczu. Opowieść biograficzna 1982
 Dickens. Opowieść biograficzna 1977
 Wincenty Pol 1982

Historical Novels
 Upiór spod Płocka 1974
 Awantury Pana na Jarczewie 1980
 Karczma na Moczydle 1975
 Narzeczona z Saragossy 1972
 Kopia i warkocze 1961
 Jezioro Czarownic 1968
 Taniec nad Jeziorem 1969

Contemporary Novels
 Przystanek za miastem 1965
 Współcześni czarownicy 1992

Children Novels
 Córka Księżyca 1970
 Spadkobiercy Pana Ziółko 1957
 Knot, Pocieszko i Spółka 1959
 Tajemnice wyspy Aotea 1961

1908 births
1988 deaths
People from Grodzisk Mazowiecki
Polish male writers
Polish military personnel of World War II
Officers of the Order of Polonia Restituta